Le più belle canzoni italiane interpretate da Mina is a compilation album by Italian singer Mina, released in 1968.

The album was composed by the same tracks of 1969 album I discorsi (except for the songs "E se domani" and "La musica è finita", replaced by "I discorsi" and "La canzone di Marinella"). The tracks for this album were chosen by the readers of the Italian magazines "Amica", "La Domenica del Corriere" and "Tribuna illustrata" and the album itself was included to those magazines as a gift.

Track listing

1968 compilation albums
Mina (Italian singer) compilation albums
Italian-language compilation albums